Trichochloritis is a genus of air-breathing land snails, terrestrial pulmonate gastropod mollusks in the subfamily Camaeninae of the family Camaenidae.

Species
 Trichochloritis adaequata (Gredler, 1894)
 Trichochloritis breviseta (L. Pfeiffer, 1862)
 Trichochloritis diploblepharis (Möllendorff, 1897)
 Trichochloritis fouresi (Morlet, 1886)
 Trichochloritis gereti (Bavay & Dautzenberg, 1900)
 Trichochloritis herziana (Möllendorff, 1888)
 Trichochloritis huberi (Thach, 2018)
 Trichochloritis hunanensis Yen, 1939
 Trichochloritis hungerfordiana (Möllendorff, 1884)
 Trichochloritis insularis (Möllendorff, 1901)
 Trichochloritis mansonensis (Gude, 1906)
 Trichochloritis miara (Mabille, 1887)
 Trichochloritis mola (Heude, 1885)
 Trichochloritis molina (Heude, 1890)
 Trichochloritis mussonena Páll-Gergely, 2020
 Trichochloritis norodomiana (Morlet, 1883)
 Trichochloritis penangensis (Stoliczka, 1873)
 Trichochloritis percussa (Heude, 1882)
 Trichochloritis pseudomiara (Bavay & Dautzenberg, 1909)
 Trichochloritis puberula (Heude, 1885)
 Trichochloritis rhinocerotica (Heude, 1890)
 Trichochloritis stanisici Thach, 2021
 Trichochloritis tanquereyi (Crosse & P. Fischer, 1863)
 Trichochloritis thaitieni Thach, 2021
Synonyms
 Trichochloritis athrix (Möllendorff, 1901): synonym of Entadella athrix (Möllendorff, 1901)
 Trichochloritis brevidens (G. B. Sowerby I, 1841): synonym of Dentichloritis brevidens (G. B. Sowerby I, 1841) (unaccepted combination)
 Trichochloritis condoriana (Crosse & P. Fischer, 1863): synonym of Bellatrachia condoriana (Crosse & P. Fischer, 1863) (subsequent combination)
 Trichochloritis diplochone (Möllendorff, 1898): synonym of Chloritis diplochone Möllendorff, 1898 (subsequent combination)
 Trichochloritis microtricha (Möllendorff, 1898): synonym of Bellatrachia condoriana (Crosse & P. Fischer, 1863) (junior synonym)
 Trichochloritis submissa (Deshayes, 1874): synonym of Trichobradybaena submissa (Deshayes, 1874) (unaccepted combination)

References

External links
 Pilsbry, H. A. (1890-1891). Manual of conchology, structural and systematic, with illustrations of the species. Ser. 2, Pulmonata. Vol. 6: Helicidae, vol. 4. pp 1-324, pls 1-69. Philadelphia, published by the Conchological Section, Academy of Natural Sciences.

Camaenidae
Gastropod genera